Attiar Hindu College (AHC) is a provincial school in Neervely, Sri Lanka. The college was found by Muthaliar Attiar A. Arunachalam (1885 - 22 September 1961) in 1929.

See also
 List of schools in Northern Province, Sri Lanka

References

External links
 Attiar Hindu College

Educational institutions established in 1929
Provincial schools in Sri Lanka
Schools in Jaffna District
1929 establishments in Ceylon